Polkinghorne is a Cornish-language surname. Notable people with the surname include:

 Adam Polkinghorne (born 1975), cricketer
 Clare Polkinghorne (born 1989), football (soccer) player
 David Polkinghorne (born 1956), footballer
 David Polkinghorne (cricketer) (born 1964), banker and cricketer
 Francis Polkinghorne Pascoe (1813–1893), entomologist
 James Polkinghorne (1788–1854), wrestler
 James Polkinghorne (footballer) (born 1989), footballer
 John Polkinghorne (born 1930), physicist & Christian theologian
 Robert Polkinghorne (born 1958), footballer
 Thomas Polkinghorne (born 1995), indirect tax lawyer 

Cornish-language surnames